Cebu City Casino Ethyl Alcohol is a professional basketball are a in the Maharlika Pilipinas Basketball League (MPBL). The team was owned by International Pharmaceuticals Incorporated with sponsorship from Casino Ethyl Alcohol.

Current roster

Head coaches

Notable players

 Eliud Poligrates
 Jondan Salvador

Season-by-season records
Records from the 2019–20 MPBL season:

References

2018 establishments in the Philippines
Basketball teams established in 2018
Maharlika Pilipinas Basketball League teams
Sports in Cebu